Gábor Pölöskei (born 11 October 1960) is a retired Hungarian football player and current manager.

He scored two goals for the Hungary national football team in the 1982 FIFA World Cup, one against El Salvador and another against Argentina.

He is the son of former Hungarian footballer Gábor Pölöskei who played for Honved Budapest.

References

1960 births
Living people
Hungarian footballers
Hungarian expatriate footballers
Hungary international footballers
Ferencvárosi TC footballers
MTK Budapest FC players
SR Delémont players
Expatriate footballers in Switzerland
1982 FIFA World Cup players
Hungarian football managers
MTK Budapest FC managers
Budapest Honvéd FC managers
People from Mosonmagyaróvár
Association football forwards
Nemzeti Bajnokság I managers
Győri ETO FC players
Sportspeople from Győr-Moson-Sopron County